Dylan Evers Budge (born 11 September 1995) is a Scottish cricketer. He made his One Day International (ODI) debut for Scotland against England on 10 June 2018. He made his Twenty20 International (T20I) debut for Scotland against Pakistan on 12 June 2018.

In June 2019, he was selected to represent Scotland A in their tour to Ireland to play the Ireland Wolves. In July 2019, he was selected to play for the Edinburgh Rocks in the inaugural edition of the Euro T20 Slam cricket tournament. However, the following month the tournament was cancelled.

In October 2019, he was added to Scotland's squad ahead of the playoff matches in the 2019 ICC T20 World Cup Qualifier tournament in the United Arab Emirates, replacing Ollie Hairs, who was ruled out due to an injury. In September 2021, Budge was named in Scotland's provisional squad for the 2021 ICC Men's T20 World Cup.

References

External links
 

1995 births
Living people
Scottish cricketers
Scotland One Day International cricketers
Scotland Twenty20 International cricketers
Cricketers from Leeds
People educated at Woodhouse Grove School
Marylebone Cricket Club cricketers
Northumberland cricketers